Culbreath may refer to:

People:
Jim Culbreath (born 1952), former American football running back
John R. Culbreath (1926–2013), American politician
Jordan Culbreath, former running back
Josh Culbreath (1932–2021), American athlete
Joy Culbreath (born 1939), Native American educator
Lynn Culbreath Noel (born 1926), African-American news reporter
Oamo Culbreath (born 1987), professional Canadian football offensive lineman

Places:
Culbreath Bayou, neighborhood within the city limits of Tampa, Florida
Culbreath Isles, neighborhood within the South Tampa district of Tampa

Ships:
SS Harry Culbreath 
SS Harry Culbreath (1942)